David Glenn may refer to:
 David Glenn (pioneer)
 David Glenn (garden designer)
 David Glenn (footballer)